The Son (2014) is a crime novel by Norwegian writer Jo Nesbø. It is the second stand-alone crime novel by Nesbø, following Headhunters (2008).

Plot
Sonny Lofthus is serving time for crimes he did not commit. As payment, he receives a steady supply of drugs to satisfy his addiction. His life changes completely when he learns the truth about his father's death.

Inspiration
Nesbø started work on The Son during Good Friday in 2012. The plot is inspired by the Bible.

Adaptation
An HBO limited series based on the novel is set to be directed by Denis Villeneuve and produced by Jake Gyllenhaal and Riva Marker's Nine Stories and Michel Litvak's Bold Films, with Jo Nesbø executive producing it alongside Niclas Salomonsson. In 2020, Lenore Zion, Jonathan Nolan and Lisa Joy were announced as co-showrunners.

References

2014 Norwegian novels
Novels by Jo Nesbø
Norwegian crime novels
21st-century Norwegian novels